Apache Guacamole is a free and open-source cross-platform Remote Desktop Gateway maintained by the Apache Software Foundation. It allows a user to take control of a remote computer or virtual machine via a web browser. The server runs on most Linux distributions and the client runs on any modern web browser. Remote access is performed via the guacd component, which uses the RDP, VNC or SSH remote protocols to access resources. Guacamole is clientless and doesn't require an agent to be installed on the resources being accessed. The fact that the client runs on web browsers allows users to connect to their remote desktops without using an installed remote desktop client.

In July 2020, serious reverse RDP vulnerabilities in Guacamole were uncovered, allowing potential attackers to take complete control of a Guacamole gateway, listen in on incoming sessions, see all the credentials used, and start sessions to control computers within the network. The method of attack was subsequently patched. The hacking has launched a House probe of whether Chinese hackers are taking advantage of the U.S. throughout the 2020 coronavirus pandemic.

References 

 
Cross-platform free software
Free software programmed in C
Software using the Apache license
Unix network-related software